The Free Belarus Initiative (Inicjatywa Wolna Białoruś) is a Polish NGO which supports the freedom of movement in Belarus; it was registered as a Non-Governmental Organization on 24 July 2006 in Poland (KRS 0000260915).

The activities of the Initiative are threefold:
 direct support for the pro-democratic movements in Belarus
 motivating Poles as well as other nationals to support the Belarusians in their struggle for democracy and Human Rights,
 delivering up-to-date information about the political repression in Belarus, support campaigns for the democratic opposition, a free press, and the free flow of information from the country.

The Initiative, in cooperation with the public Polish Television (TVP) and the authorities of the City of Warsaw organizes annual "Solidarity with Belarus" concerts.

The office of the President of the Board is occupied by Jacek Kastelaniec.

References

External links 
The website of the Free Belarus Initiative 
The website for the international audience conducted by The Free Belarus Initiative

Political organisations based in Poland
Politics of Belarus